St. John the Baptist Church is a Catholic church located in Pushkin, administratively part of the federal city of Saint Petersburg, Russia. It is part of the Roman Catholic Archdiocese of Moscow, in its northwestern deanery.

The first Catholic church in the imperial residence at Tsarskoye Selo was built in 1811, on the property of the master of ceremonies of the court, Commander Mezonyaev; but the church was not sufficient for the needs of the community. Emperor Alexander I authorized the construction of a new church on land he donated for the purpose.

The church was closed in April 1938 and became a gym.

The church was damaged during the German occupation of the city during the siege of Leningrad. The first Catholic ceremony was held on 17 March 1991, in the presence of seven Catholic parishioners. The Mass was held the following Sunday. On 1 October 1997, the church was officially returned to the Catholic parish of the city, with an agreement with the directorate of the Tsarskoye Selo State Museum of Fine Arts on the joint use of the building.

Today the church is served by two Spanish priests.

See also
Roman Catholicism in Russia

References

Roman Catholic churches in Saint Petersburg
Roman Catholic churches completed in 1826
19th-century Roman Catholic church buildings in Russia
Buildings and structures in Pushkin
Cultural heritage monuments of federal significance in Saint Petersburg
Neoclassical church buildings in Russia